David Rose (March 10, 1910 – March 4, 2006) was an artist, illustrator and art director.

Technically he actually wasn't an animator; he was a layout, concept, and storyboard artist for Disney and other animation studios such as Walt Disney and Warner Bros. Cartoons and later on became best known as an Artist Reporter documenting many historic trials of the late 20th century *(but I can’t figure out how to change the headline…)

During World War II, he worked for the Armed Forces Motion Picture Unit whence came Frank Kapra, Ted Geisel (the Dr. Seuss creator), and other well known creatives in the entertainment industry - a unit which made propaganda films including the Private Snafu cartoon series. From 1973 to 1996, he was a court room artist who covered many major trials nationally and internationally from the 70s on through the late 90s. He worked as an Art Director for MGM and NBC and was the very first Art Director at Los Angeles’s KCET (public television). He documented the Nazi General Klaus Barbie for the Magnes Museum. He worked as a graphic artist for a number of advertising agencies in Hollywood and was honored by the mayor of Los Angeles for his decades of work in all aspects of the graphic arts in the entertainment industry. He was honorednas well by the Art Directors Guild.

For his work covering the Pentagon Papers, he was nominated for an Emmy. He was the only artist journalist, in fact, who covered the Pentagon Papers. Trials he covered ranged from Patty Hearst to Rodney King to DeLorean and many many more for networks ranging from CNN and its affiliates. He was based in Los Angeles . Most of his work resides in the Smithsonian, Library of Congress, USC and UCLA Special Collections.

Related links

Witness to history: UCLA Magazine article on David Rose

1910 births
2006 deaths
Courtroom sketch artists
Warner Bros. Cartoons people

American illustrators
Art Directors Guild Awards